The seagrass wrasse, Novaculoides macrolepidotus, is a species of wrasse native to the Indian Ocean and the western Pacific Ocean. It can be found in lagoons and mangrove forests in seagrass beds or on sandy areas with plentiful algal growth. It can be found in the aquarium trade. This species is the only known member of its genus. The juveniles and smaller adults of this species are Batesian mimics of the venomous waspfish in the genus Ablabys. When threatened, these fish dive headfirst into the sea grass or sea weed beds they inhabit.

References

External links
 

Labridae
Taxa named by John Ernest Randall
 Novaculoides macrolepidotus
Fish described in 1791
Taxobox binomials not recognized by IUCN